Mordellistena liljebladi is a beetle in the genus Mordellistena of the family Mordellidae. It was described in 1945 Liljeblad, then renamed in 1965 by Ermisch.

References

liljebladi
Beetles described in 1965